Cowbell may refer to:

 Cowbell, a bell worn by freely roaming livestock, making animals easier to locate
 Cowbell (instrument), a percussion instrument

Popular culture
 Cow Belles, Disney Channel movie starring Alyson Michalka and Amanda Michalka
 "More cowbell", a pop-culture phrase made famous in a Saturday Night Live sketch
 Cowbell Man, New York Mets fan Eddie Boison who is a stadium fixture at games